Sanju Surendran, is an Indian film director, screenwriter and producer. He is a graduate of Film and Television Institute of India where he was taught by film director Mani Kaul. Sanju worked briefly as a teacher of Film Direction and Screenwriting at the KR Narayanan National Institute of Visual Science and Arts, Kottayam, Kerala. His documentary on Kutiyattam, Kapila won the National award for the best documentary. Sanju’s first feature film, Aedan- Garden of Desire won Rajathachakoram award for the best debut director and the FIPRESCI award for the best Malayalam film.

Filmography

Director

Producer

Awards and recognitions

References

External links 
 

21st-century Indian film directors
Indian male screenwriters
Living people
Malayalam film directors
Malayalam screenwriters
Film directors from Kerala
Screenwriters from Kerala
21st-century Indian male writers
Year of birth missing (living people)
21st-century Indian screenwriters